Pavenham Manor was a country house in Pavenham, Bedfordshire, England. The house was demolished in 1960.

References

Country houses in Bedfordshire
Demolished buildings and structures in England
British country houses destroyed in the 20th century
1960 disestablishments in England
Manor